Morsey is an extinct town in Warren County, in the U.S. state of Missouri.

A post office called Morsey was established in 1891, and remained in operation until 1908. The community has the name of the local Morsey family.

References

Ghost towns in Missouri
Former populated places in Warren County, Missouri